The Japanese destroyer {{nihongo|Tsuga|栂|}} was one of 21 s built for the Imperial Japanese Navy (IJN) in the late 1910s. She spent most of the Pacific War patrolling and escorting convoys in and around Chinese waters, during which the ship participated in the Battle of Hong Kong in December 1941. Tsuga was sunk by American carrier aircraft in early 1945.

Design and description
The Momi class was designed with higher speed and better seakeeping than the preceding  second-class destroyers. Tsuga was powered by two Parsons geared steam turbines, each driving one propeller shaft using steam provided by three Kampon water-tube boilers. Their crew consisted of 110 officers and crewmen.

The main armament of the Momi-class ships consisted of three  Type 3 guns in single mounts; one gun forward of the well deck, one between the two funnels, and the last gun atop the aft superstructure. The guns were numbered '1' to '3' from front to rear. The ships carried two above-water twin sets of  torpedo tubes; one mount was in the well deck between the forward superstructure and the bow gun and the other between the aft funnel and aft superstructure.

Construction and career
Tsuga, built at the Ishikawajima shipyard in Tokyo, was laid down on 5 March 1919, launched on 17 April 1920 and completed on 20 July 1920.

Pacific War
She supported the invasion of Hong Kong in December 1941 and then began convoy escort and patrolling off the Chinese coast. The ship was sunk by carrier aircraft from Task Force 38 during its South China Sea raid on 15 January 1945 at coordinates .

Notes

References

1920 ships
Ships built by IHI Corporation
Momi-class destroyers
Second Sino-Japanese War naval ships of Japan
Destroyers sunk by aircraft
Ships sunk by US aircraft
Maritime incidents in January 1945
World War II shipwrecks in the Pacific Ocean